The Great Divide is the fourth and final studio album by hard rock supergroup Allen-Lande, a collaboration between vocalists Russell Allen and Jørn Lande, released on October 17, 2014. It features Timo Tolkki as composer, producer and performer of most instruments, and Jami Huovinen on drums, replacing Magnus Karlsson and Jaime Salazar from previous albums. Lande wrote most of the lyrics, marking his first involvement as a songwriter in Allen-Lande.

Track listing

Personnel
Musicians
Russell Allen - lead and backing vocals
Jørn Lande - lead and backing vocals
Timo Tolkki - guitars, bass guitar, keyboards
Jami Huovinen - drums

Personnel
Timo Tolkki - production
Dennis Ward - mixing, mastering

References

2014 albums
Allen-Lande albums
Frontiers Records albums
Vocal duet albums